The Register of Historic Parks and Gardens of Special Historic Interest in England, created in 1983, is administered by Historic England.  It includes more than 1,600 sites, ranging from gardens of private houses, to cemeteries and public parks.

There are 136 registered parks and gardens in North East England. 5 are listed at grade I, the highest grade, 29 at grade II*, the middle grade, and 102 at grade II, the lowest grade.


Key

Parks and gardens

Cheshire

Cumbria

Greater Manchester

Lancashire

Merseyside

References

Notes

Listed parks and gardens in England
North West England